Edoardo Spinsante (born 20 May 2001), known professionally as Baltimora, is an Italian singer-songwriter and record producer, most known for winning the fifteenth season of the Italian talent show X Factor.

Biography

Early life 
Edoardo Spinsante was born in 2001 and grew up in Ancona, where he attended the liceo scientifico. In 2020, he started producing his own music under the pen name Plugsaints, with his band which include his friends Elsic, Gabbo and Jmane. In September 2021, he debuted as a singer with "Luci spente" and changed his name to Baltimora.

2021–present: X Factor Italia and career 
He participated as a contestant at the fifteenth edition of the Italian version of X Factor, and was mentored by coach Hell Raton. On 9 December 2021, he won the competition with his single "Altro". During the fifth live show on 25 November 2021, he also performed his second single entitled "Baltimora".

On 28 January 2022, he released his first single after X Factor, entitled "Colore". His first extended play Marecittà was released on 11 March 2022.

Discography

EPs 
 Marecittà (2022)

Singles 
 "Luci spente" (2021)
 "Altro" (2021)
 "Baltimora" (2021)
 "Colore" (2022)

References

Italian pop singers
Living people
The X Factor winners
X Factor (Italian TV series) contestants
People from Ancona
21st-century Italian singers
2001 births